Bill Buford (born 1954) is an American author and journalist. Buford is the author of the books Among the Thugs and Heat: An Amateur's Adventures as Kitchen Slave, Line Cook, Pasta-Maker, and Apprentice to a Dante-Quoting Butcher in Tuscany.

He was born in Baton Rouge, Louisiana, and raised in Southern California, attending the University of California, Berkeley from 1973 to 1977, before moving to King's College, Cambridge, where he studied as a Marshall Scholar until 1979. He remained in England for most of the 1980s.

Buford was previously the fiction editor for The New Yorker, where he is still on staff. For sixteen years, he was the editor of Granta, which he relaunched in 1979.

Buford is credited with coining the term "dirty realism".

Work

As an author
Among the Thugs (1991) is presented as an insider's account of the world of (primarily) English football hooliganism. His chief thesis is that the traditional sociological account of crowd theory fails to understand the often complex problem of football violence as a particularly English working-class phenomenon. His book, based on years of exhaustive first-hand research as an 'outsider'—in terms of both his background and his position as a member of the journalistic community—is considered by some to be one of the great social-research documents.

Heat (2006) is Buford's account of working for free in the kitchen of Babbo, a New York City restaurant owned by chef Mario Batali. Buford's premise is that he considered himself a capable home cook and wondered whether he had the skills to work in a busy restaurant kitchen. He met Batali at a dinner party and asked whether he would take on Buford as his "kitchen bitch".

Buford began his time at Babbo in a variety of roles including dishwasher, prep cook, garbage remover and any other role demanded of him. Over the course of the book, his skills improve and he is able to butcher a hog and work many stations in the restaurant; he traveled to Italy to meet cooks and chefs who were crucial to Batali's early culinary development, as Buford worked and lived in some of the places Batali honed his craft.

Subsequently, Buford started working on a book on French cuisine. In October 2007, his article titled "Extreme Chocolate: The Quest for the Perfect Bean" was published in The New Yorker. It described his world travels with a leader in the world of gourmet dark chocolate, Fred Schilling of Dagoba Chocolates.

Buford's article "Cooking with Daniel: Three French Classics", about his experience cooking with French chef Daniel Boulud, was published in the July 29, 2013, issue of The New Yorker. In an interview posted on The New Yorkers website to accompany the article, he discussed his time living in France and what he had learned about French cooking. The book-length treatment of Buford's time in Lyon, from December 2008 to September 2013, appeared in 2020 as Dirt: Adventures in Lyon as a Chef in Training, Father, and Sleuth Looking for the Secret of French Cooking. It details stints working with "Bob," baker at the boulangerie Philippe Richard, attending classes at the Institut Paul Bocuse, and, at greatest length, as a stagiaire at La Mère Brazier.

Salman Rushdie's The Enchantress of Florence (2008) is dedicated "to Bill Buford".

As an editor
Buford relaunched the then-defunct literary magazine Granta in 1979. Under his leadership that journal became highly influential and "rose to conquer the literary world." He edited it until 1995, when he left to become the fiction editor of The New Yorker. In 2002, The New Yorker announced that he would leave the latter position at the beginning of 2003, to be replaced by Deborah Treisman, his deputy whom he had recruited to the magazine. He remains on its staff.

Bibliography

Books

Essays and reporting

References

External links
Restaurant Guys Radio Podcast Interview, December 28, 2007
1989 Washington Post profile: Charles Trueheart, "The Man Who Gives Granta Its Grit" 

1954 births
Alumni of King's College, Cambridge
Writers from California
Living people
Writers from Baton Rouge, Louisiana
Writers from New York City
The New Yorker people
University of California, Berkeley alumni
Marshall Scholars
James Beard Foundation Award winners